Naha is the capital city of the Japanese prefecture of Okinawa. Named after it are: 
 Naha (train), a defunct sleeper train service
 Naha Airport

Other places 
 Naha, Estonia, a village
 Naha, Chiapas, a village in Mexico
 Naha-Metzabok, a biosphere reserve in Chiapas, Mexico
 Naha Flora and Fauna Protection Area, part of Naha-Metzabok Biosphere Reserve
 Naha, Honiara, a suburb of Honiara, Solomon Islands
 Naha, Ghana, a community in the Northern Region of Ghana